Enzo Martínez (born 9 September 1996) is an Argentine professional footballer who plays as a midfielder for Independiente Rivadavia on loan from Ferro Carril Oeste.

Career
Martínez's first club were Rivadavia. He was called up to the first-team substitutes bench once during his Rivadavia career, as he went unused for the then-Torneo Federal A team in a Copa Argentina tie against Defensores de Belgrano in November 2013. In 2015, Martínez joined Argentine Primera División side Gimnasia y Esgrima. He made his professional debut during 2017 in a Primera División away victory versus Talleres on 16 June 2017. In July 2018, Martínez joined Olimpo of Primera B Nacional on loan. However, the deal was terminated in August following discussions with manager Darío Bonjour.

In July 2019, Martínez headed to Torneo Federal A with Ferro Carril Oeste. He scored his first senior goal on 24 October versus Sol de Mayo. In July 2021, he was loaned out to Independiente Rivadavia until the end of 2021. In November 2021, Martínez torn his ligament in his right knee, which would keep him out for 6-8 months. He continued at Independiente Rivadavia for the 2022 season while recovering.

Career statistics
.

References

External links

1996 births
Living people
Sportspeople from Buenos Aires Province
Argentine footballers
Association football midfielders
Argentine Primera División players
Torneo Federal A players
Rivadavia de Lincoln footballers
Club de Gimnasia y Esgrima La Plata footballers
Olimpo footballers
Independiente Rivadavia footballers
People from Lincoln Partido